Dobcza  (Dibcha) is a village in the administrative district of Gmina Adamówka, within Przeworsk County, Subcarpathian Voivodeship, in south-eastern Poland.

The village has a population of 250.

References

Dobcza